KRSU may refer to: 

 KRSU (FM), a radio station (88.5 FM) licensed to Appleton, Minnesota, United States
 KRSU-TV, a television station (channel 32, virtual 35) licensed to Claremore, Oklahoma, United States